Rowen is a village on the western slopes of the Conwy valley in the parish of Caerhun and the former County of Caernarfonshire in Wales. It lies off the B5106 road, between Tal y Bont and the Groes Inn.  Buildings of Gwynedd 2009 refers to the River Roe probably following the Roman route from Caerhun to Abergwyngregyn. Rowen has won tidiest village awards several times.

In recent times the name of the village has been variously spelled as "Y Wy-Wen" (white river), "Rowen", "Ro-wen" "Roe Wen" and "Roewen".  Although the Religious Census of 1851 records the name "Ro-wen", most early 20th-century maps simply use the name "Y Ro", Welsh for "gravel" or "pebbles".  Wen means "white", or could mean "holy".

The Afon Roe, a tributary of the River Conwy, flows through the village.  A tributary of Afon Roe is Afon Tafolog, which drains the eastern slopes of Drum, a mountain in the Carneddau mountains.

In the book Crwydro Arfon (1959, by Alun Llewelyn-Williams), Rowen is described as "...one of the loveliest villages in Wales" (p. 77).

The following poem, called "Llais Afon, Ro" ("Voice of Afon Ro"), was written by G. Gerallt Davies in 1945:

And, in 1941 he published "Y Ffynnon":

The village has a hotel, Tir y Coed; a pub, Y Tŷ Gwyn; and a memorial hall, but the small primary school closed in 2011. There is a youth hostel on the slope a mile to the west of the village. Social housing came to the village in the 1960s - Llanerch Estate.

In the past, the village had a greater significance; it had three mills, and several ale houses and inns. It also had a pandy or fulling mill, so woollen cloth must have been made nearby. The village is identified in the Caerhun common enclosure award maps. The award map refers to the creation of the White Hart Road on the mountain above Fotty Gwyn and the Roman bridge, possibly related to the old royal mail coaching days. There are past associations with cattle droving and fairs. Bulkley Mill (completed 1684) is one of the notable old mills of the village. One historic source refers to a mountain cloudburst happening above the village, with properties being lost (probably   in the  mid-1800s).

Nearby is the Roman road route through Bwlch-y-Ddeufaen, with its cromlech Maen-y-Bardd.

Part of the A Family at War series (Granada TV) was filmed here.

Interesting local buildings
 Ty Pandy - the original woollen or fulling mill c.1800 and modified in Victorian times; still has a mill race and mill pond fed by the river
 Pen-y-Bont 'By the Bridge' - c.16th century, river stone cottage; possibly the oldest building in the village
 Seion Methodist Chapel and Vestry - 1841
 Former Seion Chapel - 1819
 Llannerch y Felin - Elizabethan Snowdonia-type house
 Bodafon and Fronfa - houses adjacent to the former post office with old Georgian style porches since removed; stables/store below
 Llais Afon - large village terrace house (formerly two houses) with original sash windows and a former carpenter's workshop to the side; 
 Coed Mawr Hall - probably mid-19th-century
 Rock House - large house above Coed Mawr Hall
 Tan yr Onnen cottage with dated gate stone
 Glyn Isa - 17th-century country house
 Gilfach - with lovely gardens
 Y Swan  -  old village inn, now a house
 The old cobbler's shop facing the road (near Ty Gwyn)
 Pandy - the manor (historically, Pandy was Lord of the Manorial )
 Bulkeley Mill - old mill property

Local connections 
 G. Gerallt Davies - poet and writer; Pengwern
 Huw T. Edwards - politician, poet and writer; Tros fy Tresi; see village plaque
 Edward Nefydd Evans - gardener, nurseryman and plantsman; born in Rowen in the 1930s; left in spring 2015, after 85 years
 Harriet and Jack Evans - from Llannefydd/Llansannan in the 1930s
 Isoline Gee  - Gilfach
 Arthur Tysilio Johnson - plantsman and garden writer; 1930s; A Woodland Garden in Wales 
 Margaret Lacey - actress, ballet teacher and film star in the 1960s - 70s;  I'm All Right Jack
 Kyffin Roberts - Wern;  Tyddyn Robin, Llanbedr
 Wyn Roberts, Baron Roberts of Conwy
 H. G. Williams - writer
 Scriven Williams.

References

External links

www.geograph.co.uk: photos of Rowen and surrounding area
Rowen village community website

Caerhun
Villages in Conwy County Borough
Villages in Snowdonia